Jezebel Thirteen Three is the debut studio album of LUXT, released in March 1996 by Chalkhead Records.

Reception
In his review for Jezebel Thirteen Three, Larry Miles of Black Monday praised the LUXT's penchant for melodic industrial and called the music "magnificent in its purity and simplicity." Last Sigh Magazine was enthusiastic about the band's high production quality and "hard hitting aggressive sound." Sonic Boom praised Anna Christine's vocal performances and noted that the band could achieve success on a more prominent label.

Track listing

Personnel
Adapted from the Jezebel Thirteen Three liner notes.

LUXT
 Anna Christine – bass guitar, keyboards, sampler, vocals, production, recording, engineering
 Erie Loch – guitar, keyboards, sampler, vocals, production, recording, engineering

Production and design
 Richard Muncaster – cover art

Release history

References

External links 
 Jezebel Thirteen Three at Discogs (list of releases)

1996 debut albums
LUXT albums